USS Prime is the name of two ships of the U.S. Navy:

 , a minesweeper in naval service 1944–46.
 , minesweeper commissioned in 1954, reclassified as MSO-466 in 1955, stricken in 1976.

References 

United States Navy ship names